Year 937 (CMXXXVII) was a common year starting on Sunday (link will display the full calendar) of the Julian calendar.

Events 
 By place 

 Europe 
 A Hungarian army invades Burgundy, and burns the city of Tournus. Then they go southwards to Italy, pillaging the environs of Naples, Benevento and Monte Cassino. When the Hungarians return home, they are attacked in the Apennine Mountains by Lombard forces, losing their plunder (approximate date). 
 July 11 – King Rudolph II of Burgundy dies after a 25-year reign, and is succeeded by his 12-year-old son Conrad I ("the Peaceful"). His wife, Queen Bertha, takes effective control of unified Burgundy, transferring its capital to Arles (that Burgundian kingdom was later known from the 12th century as the Kingdom of Arles). 
 King Otto I refuses to give land to his older (illegitimate) half-brother Thankmar, who gains the support of Eberhard III (duke of Franconia) and Wichmann the Elder, and seizes the fortress of Eresburg. Otto assumes direct rule over Franconia, and dissolves it into smaller counties.
 King Hugh of Arles (king of Italy) travels to Colombier (Switzerland) and marries Rudolph's widow Bertha. He takes Conrad I under his tutelage and betroths Rudolph's 6-year-old daughter Adelaide with his own son and co-ruler Lothair II.
 Winter – Gero succeeds his brother Siegfried after his death. King Otto I appoints him as count and margrave of a vast border region around Merseburg that abuts the Wends on the River Saale (Lower Saxony).
 Magdeburg becomes the capital of the East Frankish Kingdom, after a Diet held by King Otto I (approximate date).

 England 
 Battle of Brunanburh: King Æthelstan defeats a combined Northern Army under the kings Olaf of Dublin, Constantine II of Scotland and Owain of Strathclyde. Though none of the British monarchs appear to have taken part, the people of Strathclyde were a major contingent under their Scottish king.

 Asia 
 November 10 – Li Bian usurps the throne and deposes Emperor Yang Pu. The Wu State is replaced and Li (called "Xu Zhigao") becomes the first emperor of Southern Tang, one of the Ten Kingdoms in southern China.
 Winter – The Later Tang falls to the Later Jin (during the Five Dynasties and Ten Kingdoms period) founded by Emperor Shi Jingtang (posthumously known as "Gaozu of Jin").

Births 
 Attilanus, bishop of Zamora (d. 1007)
 Bagrat II, king of Iberia and Kartli (d. 994)
 Gu Hongzhong, Chinese painter (d. 975)
 Haakon Sigurdsson, Viking ruler (d. 995)
 Khalaf ibn Ahmad, Saffarid emir (d. 1009)
 Li Yu, ruler of Southern Tang (approximate date)
 Meng Xuanzhe, prince of Later Shu (d. 991)
 William IV, duke of Aquitaine (d. 994)

Deaths 
 January 11
 Cao, empress of Later Tang
 Li Chongmei, prince of Later Tang
 Li Congke, emperor of Later Tang (b. 885)
 Liu, empress of Later Tang
 January 14 – Zhang Yanlang, Chinese official
 July 11 – Rudolph II, king of Burgundy
 July 14 – Arnulf I, duke of Bavaria  
 October 10 – Wang Lingmou, chancellor of Wu 
 December 3 – Siegfried, Frankish nobleman
 Ælfwine, bishop of Lichfield (approximate date)
 Abbo, adviser and bishop of Soissons
 Alphege, bishop of Wells (approximate date)
 David II, king of Iberia/Kartli (Georgia)
 David ibn Merwan, Jewish philosopher
 Dubacan of Angus, Scottish nobleman
 Ermengol, Frankish nobleman (b. 870)
 Gebeachan, king of the Isles (Hebrides)
 Liu Yanhao, general of Later Tang
 Marozia, Roman noblewoman (b. 890)
 Tidhelm, bishop of Hereford (approximate date)
 Xu Jingqian, official and regent of Wu (b. 919)
 Yang Meng, prince of Wu (Ten Kingdoms)
 Yelü Bei, prince of the Liao Dynasty (b. 899)
 Zhao Dejun, general of Later Tang

References